Josef Kamper (1925–1984) was an international speedway rider from Austria.

Speedway career 
Kamper was a five times champion of Austria after winning the Austrian Individual Speedway Championship in 1953, 1955, 1957, 1958 and 1959.

References 

1925 births
1984 deaths
Austrian speedway riders
People from Bruck an der Leitha District
Sportspeople from Lower Austria